Stabat Mater (Latin for "the mother was standing") is a compositional form in the crucifixion of Jesus in art depicting the Virgin Mary under the cross during the crucifixion of Christ alongside John the apostle. 
 
It is common in groups of sculpture on a rood screen, and in paintings. In large hanging Crucifixions, Mary and John may be shown at a smaller scale beside Christ's torso.

Description 
In these depictions, the Virgin Mary and John the apostle are standing under the cross during the crucifixion of Christ, with only these three figures shown. Mary is almost always standing to the right hand side of the body of her son Jesus on the cross, with John standing to the left.  It is distinguished from fully populated Crucifixion scenes where there may be considerable numbers of other figures, though these three have the same positions.  It contrasts with depictions of the Swoon of the Virgin, where she is seen fainting; this is only seen from the late medieval period onwards.

In the Stabat Mater depictions the Virgin Mary is represented as an actor and spectator in the scene, a mystical emblem of faith in the Crucified Savior, an ideal figure at once the mother of Christ and the personified Church.

Biblical reference 

In the Gospel of John, chapter 19:

Similar representations 
In some depictions of the Crucifixion, Christ is alone in a "Christ on the Cross" scene, while in other representations, other people can be seen alongside Mary and John: the penitent thief, the impenitent thief, the women at the crucifixion, Roman soldiers, Jewish leaders, among others.

Stabat Mater is one of the three common artistic representations of a sorrowful Virgin Mary, the other two being Mater Dolorosa (Mother of Sorrows) and Pietà.

In Christian tradition 
The depictions generally reflect the first three lines of the "Stabat Mater" poem:

The concept is also present in other designs, e.g. the Miraculous Medal and the more general Marian Cross. The Miraculous Medal, by Saint Catherine Labouré in the 19th century, includes a letter M, representing the Virgin Mary under the Cross. 

The Marian Cross is also used in the coat of arms of Pope John Paul II, about which the Vatican newspaper, L’Osservatore Romano, stated in 1978: "the large and majestic capital M recalls the presence of the Madonna under the Cross and Her exceptional participation in Redemption."

Gallery

Notes

See also 
 Marian art in the Catholic Church
 Depiction of Jesus

Virgin Mary in art